Geoff Bouvier is an American prose poet. His first book, Living Room, was selected by Heather McHugh as the winner of the 2005 The American Poetry Review Honickman Prize. His second book, Glass Harmonica, was published in 2011 by Quale Press. Recent writings have appeared in American Poetry Review, Barrow Street, Denver Quarterly, jubilat, New American Writing, Western Humanities Review, and VOLT. He received an MFA from Bard College's Milton Avery Graduate School of the Arts in 1997, and a PhD in Poetry at Florida State University in 2016. In 2009, he was the Roberta C. Holloway visiting poet at the University of California-Berkeley. He is an Assistant Professor of Creative Writing at the University of Toronto Mississauga.

Bibliography

Poetry collections 
 Living Room. Philadelphia: Copper Canyon Press, 2005, 
 Glass Harmonica. Quale Press, 2011

References

Living people
1969 births
21st-century American poets